The Hate Crime (Misogyny) Bill was a Private Member's Bill submitted to the House of Commons of the Parliament of the United Kingdom in the 2021-2022 session of Parliament. It was sponsored by Wera Hobhouse, the Liberal Democrat MP for Bath. Its principal goal was make misogyny an aggravating factor in criminal sentencing.

References 

Proposed laws of the United Kingdom
2021 in politics